Henry Earle Robinson (March 11, 1907 — September 8, 1986) was a Canadian professional ice hockey right winger who played eleven seasons in the National Hockey League for the Montreal Maroons, Chicago Black Hawks and Montreal Canadiens between 1928 and 1940. He won the Stanley Cup with the Maroons in 1935.

Playing career
Born in Montreal, Quebec, Robinson played nine seasons for his hometown Montreal Maroons. He had his best season offensively for the Maroons in 1934–35 scoring a career high 17 goals and 35 points in 47 games. He would play for the Maroons beginning in 1928–29 up until the team ceased operating at the conclusion of the 1937-38 NHL season. The following year he was traded to the Chicago Blackhawks and recorded 15 points in 47 games. Robinson played his last season in the National Hockey League the following year for his other hometown team the Montreal Canadiens. He would spend parts of the next three years in the American Hockey League and retired from professional hockey in 1942.

Career statistics

Regular season and playoffs

Awards and achievements
 1934–35 - Stanley Cup Champion - Montreal Maroons
 1937–38 - Played in Howie Morenz Memorial Game
 1939–40 - Played in Babe Siebert Memorial Game

Transactions
 Traded by the Montreal Maroons with Russ Blinco and Baldy Northcott to the Chicago Black Hawks for $30,000, September 15, 1938.
 Sold by the Chicago Black Hawks to the Montreal Canadiens, October 11, 1939.

External links
 

1907 births
1986 deaths
Anglophone Quebec people
Canadian expatriate ice hockey players in the United States
Canadian ice hockey forwards
Chicago Blackhawks players
Ice hockey people from Montreal
Montreal Canadiens players
Montreal Maroons players
New Haven Eagles players
Ontario Hockey Association Senior A League (1890–1979) players
Philadelphia Arrows players
Providence Reds players
Stanley Cup champions
Windsor Bulldogs (1929–1936) players